Hyderabad, the capital of the southern Indian state of Telangana, is the 6th largest city in terms of area in India, with a total metro area of  and has a population of almost 10 million. As the city was founded in 1591, the present roads are not sufficient to the ever-growing city population. To respond to the rising population of the city, the Government of Telangana and Greater Hyderabad Municipal Corporation has taken up the Strategic Road Development Program for the development of roads in Hyderabad. As a part of this program, the government is planning to construct numerous flyovers and underpasses across the city. By 1 January 2023, 34 projects were successfully completed under the Strategic Road Development Programme (SRDP) scheme.

Flyovers in Hyderabad

, Hyderabad has a total of 34 completed and operational flyovers, built under the  8,000 crore Strategic Road Development Programme (SRDP). In addition to them, there are 23 flyovers in pipeline.

List of completed flyovers

The below are the flyovers located in Hyderabad, ordered by the length of flyover.

{| class="wikitable sortable"
|-
! S.No !! Flyover name !! Location !! Length (km) !! Lanes
!Completed Year
! scope="col" class="unsortable"|Notes
! scope="col" class="unsortable"|
|-
| 1 || P.V.Narasimha Rao Express Way||Mehdipatnam || 11.66 || 4 
|2009|| Longest Flyover in India 
|
|-
|2
|Kothaguda-Kondapur  Flyover 
|Kothaguda
|3
|6
|2023
|
|
|-
| 3 
| Shaikpet Flyover || Shaikpet|| 2.8 || 6 
|2021|| Second Longest Flyover of Hyderabad
|
|-
|4
|Jubilee Hills Road No. 45
|Jubilee Hills
|1.8
|4
|
|Approach flyover to the Durgam Cheruvu Bridge
|
|-
| 5 || Punjagutta Flyover || Punjagutta|| 1.7 || 4 
| 2007 ||
|
|-
|6
|Owaisi Hospital
|Owaisi Junction
|1.65
|3
|
|
|
|-
| 7 || Sardar Patel  Flyover || Secunderabad|| 1.2 || 4 
| ||
|
|-
| 8 || Moula Ali Flyover (ROB) || Moula Ali|| 1.2 || 4 
| ||
|
|-
|9
|JNTU-Malaysia Township Flyover
|Kukatpally
|1.2
|6
|2019
|
|
|-
| 10
|Balanagar Flyover
|Balanagar
|1.13
|6
|2021
|Phase I of Strategic Road Development Plan (SRDP)
|
|-
| 11 || Telugu Thalli Flyover || Saifabad|| 1.1 || 4 
|2005||
|
|-
| 12 || Greenlands Flyover || Begumpet|| 1.1 || 4 
| 2009||
|
|-
| 13 || Chandrayan Gutta Flyover |Chandrayan gutta
|Chandrayan Gutta|| 1.07 || 4 
| ||
|
|-
| 14 || YMCA Flyover || Narayanaguda|| 1.0 || 4 
| ||
|
|-
|15
|Nagole Flyover 
|Nagole
|0.99
|6
|
|
|
|-
| 16 || Gachibowli Crossroad Flyover || Gachibowli|| 0.95 || 4 
| ||
|
|-
| 17 || Kamineni LHS Flyover ||Kamineni Hospital Junction|| 0.94 || 3 
|2018||
|
|-
|18
|Kamineni RHS Flyover
|Kamineni Hospital Junction
|0.94
|3
|2020
|
|
|-
| 19 || Kukatpally Flyover (ROB) || Kukatpally|| 0.91 || 4 
| ||
|
|-
| 20 || Begumpet Flyover (ROB)|| Begumpet|| 0.9 || 6 
| ||
|
|-
| 21 || Masab Tank Flyover || Masab Tank|| 0.9 || 2 
| 2001||
|
|-
|22
|Bio-Diversity Park Level 2 Flyover
|Gachibowli
|0.9
|3
|2019
|
|
|-
|23
|Yamnampet Flyover (ROB)
|Yamnampet, Ghatkesar
|0.9
|2
|
|
|
|- 
| 24 || Moosapet Flyover (ROB) || Moosapet|| 0.85 || 4 
| ||
|
|-
| 25 || Mindspace Flyover || Raheja Mindspace|| 0.83 || 4 
| ||
|-
|26
|Gachibowli Junction Level 1 Flyover
|Gachibowli
|0.8
|3
|2022
|
|
|-
|27
|Bairamalguda RHS Flyover
|Bairamalguda
|0.78
|3
|2020
|Package II of Strategic Road Development Plan (SRDP)
|
|-
| 28 || Langer House Flyover || Langer House|| 0.76 || 4 
| ||
|
|-
|29
|Fateh Nagar Flyover (ROB)
|Balkampet
|0.75
|4
|
|
|
|-
| 30 || Paradise-CTO Flyover || Paradise/MG Road|| 0.7 || 4 
| ||
|
|-
| 31 || Hitech City Flyover || Hitech City|| 0.7 || 4 
| ||
|
|-
| 32 || Tellapur Flyover (ROB) ||Serilingampally|| 0.7 || 4 
|2014||
|
|-
| 33 || Hafeezpet Flyover (ROB) || Hafeezpet|| 0.7 || 4 
| ||
|
|-
|34
|Bio-Diversity Park Level 1 Flyover
|Gachibowli
|0.69
|3
|2020
|
|
|-
| 35 || Tolichowki Flyover ||Tolichowki|| 0.65 || 6 
|2013||
|
|-
| 36 || Sitaphalmandi Flyover (ROB) || Sitaphalmandi|| 0.65 || 4 
| ||
|
|-
| 37 || Khairatabad Flyover (ROB) || Khairatabad|| 0.6 || 4 
| ||
|
|-
| 38 || RK Puram Flyover (ROB) || Neredmet|| 0.6 || 2 
| ||
|
|-
| 39 || Lalapet Flyover (ROB) || Lalapet|| 0.6 || 4 
| ||
|
|-
| 40 || Tarnaka Flyover || Tarnaka|| 0.6 || 3 
| ||
|
|-
| 41 || Nalgonda 'X' Roads Flyover || Nalgonda 'X' Roads|| 0.54 || 4 
| ||
|
|-
| 42 || Basheerbagh Flyover || Basheerbagh|| 0.5 || 4 
| ||
|
|-
| 43 || Narayanaguda Flyover || Narayanaguda|| 0.5 || 2 
| ||
|
|-
| 44 || Dabeerpura Flyover (ROB) || Dabeerpura|| 0.5 || 4 
| ||
|
|-
| 45 || Jamia Osmania Flyover (ROB) || Jamia Osmania|| 0.5 || 2 
| ||
|
|-
|46
|LB Nagar LHS Flyover
|LB Nagar
|0.5
|4
|2019
|
|
|-
}

List of approved / in-construction flyovers

As a part of the Strategic Road Development Program for Greater Hyderabad, the Government of Telangana and Greater Hyderabad Municipal Corporation have planned to construct eighteen flyovers and four underpasses across Hyderabad. Tenders were called for this project and the project has been assigned to the M. Venkata Rao Infra Projects Pvt. Ltd (MVR) and BSCPL Infrastructure Ltd.

Underpasses in Hyderabad

, Hyderabad has eight completed underpass near Aramghar Junction, Ayyappa Society in Madhapur, Raheja Mindspace IT Park, L. B. Nagar and Hitech City railway station. Two more underpasses are under construction.

List of completed underpasses

List of approved/in construction underpasses

References

flyovers and underpasses
Flyovers and underpasses in hyderabad
Flyovers and underpasses in Hyderabad